Bellova Ves  is a village and municipality in the Dunajská Streda District in the Trnava Region of south-west Slovakia.

Census 2011: 229 inhabitants
122 Slovaks, 56 Hungarians and 51 others nationality

Geography
The municipality lies at an altitude of 119 metres and covers an area of 6.929 km².  The village has food shop and a public library.

References

Villages and municipalities in Dunajská Streda District
Hungarian communities in Slovakia